Keilir (378 m asl) is a Pleistocene subglacial mound or perhaps a conical tuya on Reykjanes Peninsula in Iceland. Basal area is 0.773 km2, summit area 0.004 km2, basal width 0.99 km, summit width 0.07 km, volume  0.0362 km3.

It is located within the area of Krýsuvík volcanic system and Reykjanesfólkvangur. It is  about 17 miles southwest of the capital city Reykjavík,

In March 2021 the mountain began to emit earthquakes followed by a fissure lava eruption further southwest at Fagradalsfjall.

Formation
Keilir was formed during a subglacial fissure eruption which concentrated in the end at one vent. Except the cone, also some small subglacially formed hills to the north are results of this eruption.

Eruptions under the Weichselian glaciers on Reykjanes Peninsula
When stratigraphy is considered in detail, it tells about the different parts of this eruption: The eruption thawed the glacier ice and formed a subglacial lake in which the volcano continued to develop. The water very soon touched the magma within the vent and caused explosive activity. Tephra set down in layers into the subglacial lake. With time, the tephra built up a hill and small elongated mountain over the vent(s). When such an eruption is continued over a longer time span, the water in the end does not reach the vent(s) any more and lava begins to flow.

In the top region of Keilir, there is a small cap of lava (area of lava cap 0,020 km2) which could mean that the volcanic mountain is a tuya (the lava being from subaerial eruptions at the end of the eruption series) or perhaps just represents a volcanic plug (the lava cooled and plugged up the vent).

Ice thickness and more exact time of eruption in the case of Keilir are not known, just that it took place during the Pleistocene (Weichselian).

Comparison to an Antarctic subglacial tuff cone
Smellie and other scientists newly discovered a similar monogenetic subglacial tuff cone within the ice of Antarctica and could determine the thickness of ice which covered the vent during eruption. The Antarctic cone did lie under a polar ice sheet and not a temperate glacier as was the case with Keilir. Additionally, the Antarctic cone is much older (around 640 000 years), whereas Keilir is up to 100 000 years old. And the tuff cone from Victoria Land, Antarctica, is placed next to known granitic plutonic complexes and seems to be a parasitic cone of a stratovolcano, whereas Keilir is located adjacent to presently active volcanic systems and looks as if it were placed on top of the shield volcano Þráinskjöldur, though the last one is younger than the subglacial formation. Interestingly, similar tectonics, rift zones, are behind both expressions of volcanism: the West Antarctic Rift System on the one hand, and in the case of Keilir the Reykjanes Rift as part of the rift zones crossing Iceland. Also similar are their rocks – mafic lapilli tuff (in Icelandic: móberg).

Landmark
As the mountain is easily recognized from afar, eg. from Reykjavík, but also from sea, it was used as a landmark by  fishermen and seamen for many centuries.

Hiking
There is a hiking trail leading up on the mountain from ENE. At the top, a guestbook can be found within a box.

An excellent view over a big part of Reykjanes Peninsula and Faxaflói is to be expected from the top in good weather.

See also
 Geology of Reykjanes Peninsula
 Krýsuvík (volcanic system)

References

Reykjanes
Subglacial volcanoes of Iceland
Mountains of Iceland
Pleistocene volcanoes